Camp General Servillano S. Aquino is a military base in Tarlac City, Philippines.

History
Under Proclamation No. 255 issued on June 3, 1964 by the administration of President Diosdado Macapagal, certain parcels of land in the then municipality of Tarlac (now Tarlac City) was allocated to the Armed Forces of the Philippines (AFP) for military reservation purposes. Camp Servillano Aquino would later built on the site and would serve as the headquarters of the AFP's Northern Luzon Command.

In the 2020s, the Philippine Army started to move its headquarters to Camp Aquino from Fort Bonifacio in Taguig. In 2022, the Bases Conversion and Development Authority (BCDA) turned over the first set of newly-constructed facilities to the Army Support Command (ASCOM).

References

Military facilities in Tarlac
Buildings and structures in Tarlac City